MCM Pop is a French language music video TV channel owned by MCM Group, a division of Lagardère Active. MCM Pop was closed down on 1 October 2014 at 23:59, in France, to make way for RFM TV, on 2 October at 6pm, but is still broadcast in Portugal, with the same musical programming as RFM TV, but with a delay of 1h30.

History
 On 3 April 2001, MCM 2 was created by Lagardère Active. The string then diffuses clips 1980s and 90 and target the generation that experienced the beginnings of his colleague MCM.
 To enrich the offer music channels, Lagardère Active launches November 28, 2003 MCM Music + channels. It is then composed of three chains: MCM, MCM Top (newly created), and MCM Pop, replacing MCM 2.Then, latter MCM Pop broadcasts clips from the 1980s to today and enriches its program schedule.
 Since 29 March 2011, the channel broadcasts in 16:9 format
 On 1 October 2014, MCM Pop was replaced by RFM TV in France

Slogans

From 2010 to October 2014:« Le meilleur des années 80 à nos jours » ("The best of the 80s to today")

Мanagement
 Secretary General, Programs and Antennas: Laurent Micouleau
 Program Director: Nicolas Gicquel
 Presenter and journalist: François Olivier Nolorgues

Programming blocks
 Hit RFM
 Pop List
 Pop Tonic
 Pop Legend
 Pop 80
 Pop 90
 Pop 2000
 Pop Kitsch
 Dance 90
 Top 50 Culte
 Pop Culte
 Pop Rock
 Pop Dance
 Pop Tendance
 Pop Disco
 Pop & Co
 Émissions diffusées sur MCM

References

External links
 

French-language television stations
Defunct television channels in France
Television channels and stations established in 2003
Television channels and stations disestablished in 2014
2003 establishments in France
2014 disestablishments in France